The 2011 Team Speedway Junior World Championship was the seventh FIM Team Under-21 World Championship season. The final took place on 3 September, 2011 at Balakovo in Russia. It was the first final in Russia. The defending Champions were Denmark.

Results 
As the 2011 Under-21 World Cup Final was staged in Russia, the Russian team was seeded directly into the Final. The other three finalists were to be determined in two Semi-Finals on May 28.

However, Sweden, who qualified for the Final by winning Semi-final 1, and Australia who qualified by winning Semi-final 2, both withdrew from the Final due to travel cost and visa problems. After both Poland and Finland declined to replace them, their places in the Final was taken by Ukraine and Czech Republic. Anticipating cost and visa problems, Great Britain declined to enter a team in the 2011 Junior World Cup.

On home soil, the Russians easily won their first Under-21 World Cup, scoring 61 points to claim a massive 30 point victory over reigning champions Denmark. Ukraine and Czech Republic finished tied on 29 points each with Ukraine's Aleksandr Loktaev defeating Václav Milík, Jr. in a runoff to decide third place.

Heat details

Qualifying round 
 2 May 2011
  Rivne
 Referee:  Jim Lawrence
 Jury President:  Andrzej Grodzki
References

Semifinal 1

 28 May 2011
  Rawicz
 Referee:  Craig Ackroyd
 Jury President:  David Joiner
 Attendance: 1,200
 References

Semifinal 2

 28 May 2011
  Diedenbergen
 Referee:  Marek Wojaczek
 Jury President:  Anthony Steele
 References

Final 

 3 September 2011
  Balakovo
 Stadion Trud (Length: 380 m)
 Referee:  Istvan Darago

See also 
 2011 Speedway World Cup
 2011 Individual Speedway Junior World Championship

References 

2011
World Team Junior